Battle of Sangju may refer to:
Battle of Sangju (1592), one of the first battles in the Imjin War
Battle of Sangju (1950), a battle in the Korean War